Australia competed at the 2015 World Championships in Athletics in Beijing, China, from 22–30 August 2015.

Medalists
The following competitors from Australia won medals at the Championships

Results
(q – qualified, NM – no mark, SB – season best)

Men
Track and road events

Field events

Women 
Track and road events

Field events

Sources 
 Australian team

Nations at the 2015 World Championships in Athletics
World Championships in Athletics
Australia at the World Championships in Athletics